The Girls of Old Town are fictional characters in Frank Miller's Sin City. Within the universe of Sin City, they are a group of self-governing prostitutes.

During the days of the Gold Rush, when the town of Basin City had just been settled, the Roark family "imported" a large number of women from across the globe into the open and uncontrolled area, turning a struggling mining camp into a thriving, bustling city and securing themselves a vast fortune and control over the city. These women ended up forming the district that would become Old Town, the prostitute quarter. In addition, the people charged with governing the city, most of them from the Roark line, remained in power for generations, running it as they saw fit. It is suggested by The Big Fat Kill that during this time, Old Town's female residents were subjugated and virtually enslaved under the combined malign influence of politics, pimps and mobsters.

Eventually, the women formed a truce with the police department, allowing the women to defend their own turf, drive out the pimps and mobsters and administer vigilante justice to those that wronged them. The cops get a slice of the profits and 'free fun' outside of work hours. If a cop tries to enter the boundaries of Old Town while on duty, he is sent back with his tail between his legs — usually after being humiliated by the girls —. Nevertheless, he is sent back alive; The Big Fat Kill illustrates the danger of what would happen if a cop were ever discovered to have been murdered on Old Town turf, and the lengths the mob were willing to go to in order to seize control of the neighborhood.

The girls themselves are portrayed fairly sympathetically in the series, usually as hookers with hearts of gold in a male-dominated metropolis, while not averse to issuing their own brand of justice on those who cross them. Many of the characters appear as caricatures of popular female stereotypes and pop culture icons, such as Old Town girls dressed as Wonder Woman, Zorro, Southern belles and cowgirls.

Leadership
Goldie and Wendy, the twin prostitutes who are currently in charge of Old Town, taking control of the neighborhood just prior to the events of A Dame to Kill For. While little is revealed about Goldie initially, and indeed the resemblance between the two is so uncanny that even her onetime lover Marv is fooled upon first meeting Wendy. He surmises that Goldie must have been 'the nice one' after taking several beatings from Wendy (who had thought him responsible for her sister's murder at the beginning of The Hard Goodbye). However, once Wendy comes to understand that Marv's motive is to avenge her sister, she joins his quest and is touched by the lengths he will go to see this through. She softens to him, seeming to empathize with his plight, maybe even developing feelings for him. When Marv is incarcerated pending execution, Wendy comes to him to spend the night. She tells him he can call her Goldie (her sister's name) so that he can pretend to be with the woman he loved and for whom he risked everything. Following his execution, she is shown on at least one occasion wearing Marv's cross around her neck. In the movie, both Goldie and Wendy are played by Jaime King.

Enforcers
Gail, a prostitute, dominatrix and one of the authority figures of Old Town, second only to the Twins. Standing 6 feet tall and wearing an outfit made of a combination of leather, fishnet stockings and metal studs, and occasionally bondage masks. She is often seen wielding an Uzi submachine gun. She has a love-hate relationship with Dwight McCarthy, who claims the only reason he is still alive at all is "that one fiery night when she was mine" and the unreturnable love she feels for him. As of the end of The Big Fat Kill, the status of their relationship is in question, despite the ending of The Big Fat Kill in the movie adaptation, and the events of Family Values. Miller has said on the audio commentary track for the movie that Gail's character is comparable, in many ways, to that of Catwoman. She is played by Rosario Dawson.
Miho, a highly skilled, rollerskate-savvy assassin who trains and protects the women of Old Town. Among her arsenal are twin katana samurai swords, throwing stars in the shape of the Manji symbol, and a Mongolian bow. Popular belief maintains she is not a prostitute. She is played by Devon Aoki. In the 2014 sequel, A Dame to Kill For, Aoki is replaced by Jamie Chung.

Others
Sally, an Old Town girl and Joey's mistress, who tries to kill her to cover-up his infidelity. Luckily, Dwight, who is photographing him, smashes through a window and saves her.  She is played by Juno Temple in Sin City: A Dame to Kill For.
Molly, an Old Town girl who is seemingly a doctor and expert surgeon. She saves Dwight's life, at Gail's insistence, when he is repeatedly shot by Ava Lord, and later performs surgery on his face to alter his appearance.
Kelley, Sandy and Denise, a group of Old Town girls who were victims of a group of white slavers led by a man named Manuel. Though their fate is never revealed, Dwight presumably makes sure their jailers were dealt with accordingly.
Becky, a young Old Town prostitute who also works for Herr Wallenquist as a spy, betraying her friends for a chance at a new life. Gail later finds out that Becky is a spy and bites off the left side of her neck, then later shoots her during The Big Fat Kill. In the epilogue of the movie adaptation, Becky is only shot in the arm and escapes to the hospital. In the hospital on an elevator she meets Salesman, a freelance assassin, who presumably kills her. Becky is played by Alexis Bledel.
Dallas, Old Town prostitute and Miho's driver. She is gunned down by mercenaries in The Big Fat Kill. In the movie she is seen wearing a Zorro costume, sometimes with a matching domino mask.
Tammy, an Old Town 'nurse' who Liebowitz uses to taunt and torture John Hartigan.
Carmen, Old Town prostitute with a traumatic past; lover to Daisy. In Family Values, she is accidentally gunned down during a hit on the supporting character Bruno, carried out by the Magliozzi Crime Family.
Daisy, Carmen's lover. She avenges Carmen's death by killing the remaining Magliozzi family members.

References

Comics characters introduced in 1991
Fictional prostitutes
Fictional female assassins
Sin City characters
Female characters in film
Fictional characters from Washington (state)
Characters created by Frank Miller (comics)
Female characters in comics